Ampuero is a surname. Notable people with the surname include:

Álvaro Ampuero (born 1992), Peruvian footballer
Branco Ampuero (born 1993), Chilean footballer
Evelyn Ampuero (born 1987), Peruvian volleyball player
Jorge Ampuero (born 1987), Chilean footballer 
José Joaquín Ampuero y del Río (1872-1932), Spanish politician and businessman
José María Ampuero Jáuregui (1837-1917), Spanish politician
Juan Carlos Sánchez Ampuero (born 1985), Bolivian footballer
Ramón Miranda Ampuero (born 1926), Peruvian general and minister
Roberto Ampuero (born 1953), Chilean author, columnist and minister